European route E 75 is part of the International E-road network, which is a series of main roads in Europe.

The E 75 starts at the town of Vardø in Norway by the Barents Sea, and it runs south through Finland, Poland, Czech Republic, Slovakia, Hungary, Serbia, North Macedonia, and Greece. (The northernmost one is E69)

From the beginning of the 1990s until 2009, there was no ferry connection between Helsinki and Gdańsk. However, Finnlines started a regular service between Helsinki and Gdynia. It is also possible to take a ferry from Helsinki to Tallinn and drive along the E67 from Tallinn to Piotrków Trybunalski in Poland and then continue with the E75.

Settlements

Major towns and cities on the E75 are:

Route

: Vardø – Varangerbotn (Start of Concurrency with )  – Utsjoki (End of Concurrency with )

: Utsjoki – Ivalo – Sodankylä – Rovaniemi – Kemi – Oulu – Jyväskylä – Lahti – Helsinki
: Helsinki
:  Helsinki –  Gdynia
No ferry to Gdynia. Closest alternative is Helsinki - Gdańsk

: Gdańsk
: Gdańsk
: Gdańsk – Pruszcz Gdański
: Pruszcz Gdański – Grudziądz – Toruń – Łódź – Piotrków Trybunalski
: Piotrków Trybunalski – Częstochowa
: Częstochowa – Pyrzowice
: Pyrzowice – Podwarpie
: Podwarpie – Dąbrowa Górnicza
: Dąbrowa Górnicza – Mysłowice (Start of Concurrency with ) – Tychy
: Tychy – Bielsko-Biała
: Bielsko-Biała – Cieszyn

: Český Těšín (Start of Concurrency with )
: Český Těšín (End of Concurrency with ) - Mosty u Jablunkova

: Svrčinovec - Čadca
: Čadca - Žilina
: Žilina (Start of Concurrency with )
: Žilina - Trenčín (End of Concurrency with ) - Trnava (Start of Concurrency with ) - Bratislava

: Rajka - Mosonmagyaróvár
: Budapest
: Budapest - Újhartyán (End of Concurrency with ) - Kecskemét - Szeged

: Horgoš - Subotica - Novi Sad - Belgrade - Paraćin - Niš - Preševo

: Tabanovce - Kumanovo - Petrovec (Towards  and Skopje) - Gevgelija

: Evzonoi - Thessaloniki -  Larissa - Lamia - Thermopylae - Thiva - Athens 
 Athens - Chania
: Chania
: Chania - Heraklion
: Heraklion - Hersonissos
: Hersonissos - Sitia

Gallery

See also
Finnish national road 4
Autostrada A1 (Poland)
E75 in Serbia
E75 in North Macedonia
Motorway 1 (Greece)

References

External links 
 UN Economic Commission for Europe: Overall Map of E-road Network (2007)

75
E075
E075
E075
E075
E075
E075
E075
E075
E075
National Tourist Routes in Norway
Roads within the Arctic Circle